Lepturges amabilis is a species of beetle in the family Cerambycidae. It was described by Bates in 1863.

References

Lepturges
Beetles described in 1863